The 2014 Orange County Blues FC season is the club's fifth season of existence, and their fifth season playing in the third division of American soccer, USL Pro.

Roster 

as of May 31, 2014

Competitions

USL Pro

Standings

Match results

U.S. Open Cup

References 

2014 USL Pro season
Orange County SC seasons
American soccer clubs 2014 season
2014 in sports in California